Saint Amador of Portugal or of Guarda (Monsanto (Idanha-a-Nova), unknown date in the middle ages) was a hermit from Portugal. He was venerated as a saint by the Catholic Church and his feast day is celebrated on the 27th of March.

Life

Amador was born in Monsanto on the edge of the Diocese of Guarda. He retired to the hermitage of São Pedro Vir-on-Corces, where he lived for many years. One day he found an abandoned newborn, whom he raised and educated, and who also became a hermit and priest in the same place. Over time, the cave where they lived was converted into a chapel.

Legend

No one knew from where he had come nor his name, but because of his kindness, he was called Amador ("lover" or "embodiment of love"). In the neighborhood there was a woman of very bad temper who was reputed to fight with everyone. Her name was Ricarda and she was known to visit Amador, bringing him bread and fresh water. Despite her constant arguing and bad temper, Amador did not waver from his loving kindness toward her. One day the woman went far away, returning with a small child, her son. Amador asked Ricarda to allow him to baptize the child, but Ricarda objected, shouting at the boy saying that he was a crybaby and would never have any friends, if only the demons would take him. According to the legend, a group of demons appeared and took the child, lifting it into the air. At the same time the ground opened and swallowed Ricarda.

Amador prayed with such faith to save the child that the demons were forced to release it, and the child fell to his feet unharmed. The hermit asked for help from God to raise the child, and God sent him a female deer every day who nourished the child with her milk. The child, growing up under Amador's care, became a monastic in the same tradition, and helped Amador as he aged. One day it was revealed that the father of the young monk had died and was suffering in purgatory, and Amador advised the young man to say Mass and to pray for his father's salvation. At some point soon after, Amador received a revelation that the prayers had been answered and the father's soul had been admitted to paradise. The boy continued to attend Amador and to praise his holiness and love until Amador's death and burial.

The boy continued taking care of the church, following his master's way of life, and when he died he was buried with Amador beneath the altar of the church.

Veneration

The chapel became a place of pilgrimage and miracles attributed to the intercession of the saint, as well as protection against aphid pests and lizards in the fields. Some churches, particularly in the diocese of Guarda, are dedicated to him. His liturgical celebration is on 27 March.

References

External links
 http://purl.pt/12169/3/hg-1443-v/hg-1443-v_item1/hg-1443-v_PDF/hg-1443-v_PDF_01-B-R0300/hg-1443-v_0029_320-331_t01-B-R0300.pdf

Christian saints in unknown century
Portuguese Roman Catholic saints
Portuguese hermits
Year of birth unknown
People from Idanha-a-Nova